Raphitoma contigua is a species of sea snail, a marine gastropod mollusc in the family Raphitomidae.

Description
The length of the shell varies between 5 mm and 12 mm.

Distribution
This marine species occurs in the Mediterranean Sea.

References

External links
 Monterosato T. A. (di) (1884). Nomenclatura generica e specifica di alcune conchiglie mediterranee. Palermo, Virzi, 152 pp
 Gastropods.com: Raphitoma contigua
 
 ÖZTÜRK, BİLAL, et al. "Marine molluscs of the Turkish coasts: an updated checklist." Turkish Journal of Zoology 38.6 (2014): 832-879

contigua
Gastropods described in 1884